S&T Daewoo XK8, also known as DAR-21 (Daewoo Assault Rifle-21st Century), is a 5.56×45mm NATO bullpup assault rifle developed and manufactured by S&T Daewoo intended to replace Daewoo Precision Industries K2 assault rifle for the Republic of Korea Armed Forces.

XK8 was the first firearm developed solely by the Korean defense company without the request from the military. However, after the field tests by Republic of Korea Army Special Warfare Command, it was rejected and was not mass-produced.

History
The prototype was first developed in 2003.

Development
The XK8 was made out of high-strength plastic and polymer materials with the ejection port on the right side and the cocking lever on the left side. The fire selector consists of semi-auto, three round burst and full auto.

See also
Daewoo Precision Industries K2
S&T Daewoo K11

References

External links

5.56 mm assault rifles
Bullpup rifles
Daewoo assault rifles
Post–Cold War weapons of South Korea
Firearms of Korea